Presidential elections were held in Ecuador on 10 and 11 January 1940. The result was a victory for Carlos Alberto Arroyo del Río of the Ecuadorian Radical Liberal Party, who received 53% of the vote.

Results

References

Presidential elections in Ecuador
Ecuador
1940 in Ecuador
Election and referendum articles with incomplete results